was an outdoor tennis venue located in Ōta, Tokyo, Japan.  It had a capacity of 10,000.

External links
Denen Tennis Club website

Tennis venues in Japan
Defunct sports venues in Japan
Sports venues in Tokyo
Ōta, Tokyo
Sports venues completed in 1936
1936 establishments in Japan
1989 disestablishments in Japan